Algunja is a village in the municipality of Staro Nagoričane, North Macedonia.

Demographics
As of the 2021 census, Algunja had 300 residents with the following ethnic composition:
Serbs 136
Macedonians 85
Persons for whom data are taken from administrative sources 69
Others 10

According to the 2002 census, the village had a total of 237 inhabitants. Ethnic groups in the village include:
Serbs 149
Macedonians 88

References

Villages in Staro Nagoričane Municipality
Serb communities in North Macedonia